European Sociological Review is a bimonthly peer-reviewed academic journal published by Oxford University Press focusing on all sociology fields. It is the official journal of the European Consortium for Sociological Research. The editor-in-chief is Fabrizio Bernardi (National University of Distance Education). The journal was published three times per year from 1985 to 1997; quarterly from 1998 to 2002; and five times per year from 2003 to 2008.

Abstracting and indexing
This journal is abstracted and indexed by: 
Current Contents/Social and Behavioral Sciences
Social Sciences Citation Index
CSA Worldwide Political Science Abstracts
Scopus

References

External links

Oxford University Press academic journals
Bimonthly journals
Sociology journals
Publications established in 1985
English-language journals